Al-Kasayir was a Palestinian Arab village in the Haifa Subdistrict, located 13 km east of Haifa. It was depopulated during the 1947–48 Civil War in Mandatory Palestine on April 16, 1948, under the Battle of Mishmar HaEmek.

History
Many inhabitants were Muslim Arabs who traced their origins to North Africa.

In the 1945 statistics  Khirbat Al-Kasayir was counted among  Shefa-'Amr  suburbs, and it was noted with a population of  290 Muslims.

References

Bibliography

External links
Welcome To al-Kasayir, Khirbat
Khirbat al-Kasair, Zochrot
Survey of Western Palestine, Map 5:   IAA, Wikimedia commons 

Arab villages depopulated prior to the 1948 Arab–Israeli War
District of Haifa